Passiflora, known also as the passion flowers or passion vines, is a genus of about 550 species of flowering plants, the type genus of the family Passifloraceae.

They are mostly tendril-bearing vines, with some being shrubs or trees. They can be woody or herbaceous. Passion flowers produce regular and usually showy flowers with a distinctive corona. There can be as many as eight coronal series, as in the case of P. xiikzodz. The flower is pentamerous and ripens into an indehiscent fruit with numerous seeds.

List of species

Distribution
Passiflora has a largely neotropic distribution, unlike other genera in the family Passifloraceae, which includes more Old World species (such as the genus Adenia). The vast majority of Passiflora are found in Mexico, Central America, the United States and South America, although there are additional representatives in Southeast Asia and Oceania. New species continue to be identified: for example, P. xishuangbannaensis and P. pardifolia have only been known to the scientific community since 2005 and 2006, respectively.

Some species of Passiflora have been naturalized beyond their native ranges. For example, the blue passion flower (P. caerulea) now grows wild in Spain. The purple passionfruit (P. edulis) and its yellow relative flavicarpa have been introduced in many tropical regions as commercial crops.

Ecology

Passion flowers have floral structures adapted for biotic pollination. Pollinators of Passiflora include bumblebees, carpenter bees (e.g., Xylocopa sonorina), wasps, bats, and hummingbirds (especially hermits such as Phaethornis); some others are additionally capable of self-pollination. Passiflora often exhibit high levels of pollinator specificity, which has led to frequent coevolution across the genus. The sword-billed hummingbird (Ensifera ensifera) is a notable example: it, with its immensely elongated bill, is the sole pollinator of 37 species of high Andean Passiflora in the supersection Tacsonia.

The leaves are used for feeding by the larvae of a number of species of Lepidoptera. Famously, they are exclusively targeted by many butterfly species of the tribe Heliconiini. The many defensive adaptations visible on Passiflora include diverse leaf shapes (which help disguise their identity), colored nubs (which mimic butterfly eggs and can deter Heliconians from ovipositing on a seemingly crowded leaf), extrafloral nectaries, trichomes, variegation, and chemical defenses. These, combined with adaptations on the part of the butterflies, were important in the foundation of coevolutionary theory.

The following lepidoptera larvae are known to feed on Passiflora:
 Longwing butterflies (Heliconiinae)
 Cydno longwing (Heliconius cydno), one of few Heliconians to feed on multiple species of Passiflora
 Gulf fritillary (Agraulis vanillae), which feeds on several species of Passiflora, such as Passiflora lutea, Passiflora affinis, stinking passion flower (P. foetida), and Maypop (P. incarnata)
 American Sara longwing (Heliconius sara)
 Red postman (Heliconius erato)
 Asian leopard lacewing (Cethosia cyane).
 Postman butterfly (Heliconius melpomene) prefer P. menispermifolia and P. oerstedii
 Zebra longwing (Heliconius charithonia) feed on yellow passion flower, two-flowered passion flower (P. biflora), and corky-stemmed passion flower (P. suberosa)
 Banded orange (Dryadula phaetusa) feed on P. tetrastylis
 Julia butterfly (Dryas iulia) feed on yellow passion flower and P. affinis
 Swift moth Cibyra serta
 Tawny Coster (Acraea terpsicore) feed on Passiflora edulis, Passiflora foetida and Passiflora subpeltata 

The generally high pollinator and parasite specificity in Passiflora may have led to the tremendous morphological variation in the genus. It is thought to have among the highest foliar diversity among all plant genera, with leaf shapes ranging from unlobed to five-lobed frequently found on the same plant. Coevolution can be a major driver of speciation, and may be responsible for the radiation of certain clades of Passiflora such as Tacsonia.

The bracts of the stinking passion flower are covered by hairs which exude a sticky fluid. Many small insects get stuck to this and get digested to nutrient-rich goo by proteases and acid phosphatases. Since the insects usually killed are rarely major pests, this passion flower seems to be a protocarnivorous plant.

Banana passion flower or "banana poka" (P. tarminiana), originally from Central Brazil, is an invasive weed, especially on the islands of Hawaii. It is commonly spread by feral pigs eating the fruits. It overgrows and smothers stands of endemic vegetation, mainly on roadsides. Blue passion flower (P. caerulea) is holding its own in Spain these days, and it probably needs to be watched so that unwanted spreading can be curtailed.

On the other hand, some species are endangered due to unsustainable logging and other forms of habitat destruction. For example, the Chilean passion flower (P. pinnatistipula) is a rare vine growing in the Tropical Andes southwards from Venezuela between  altitude, and in Coastal Central Chile, where it only occurs in a few tens of square kilometres of fog forest by the sea, near Zapallar. P. pinnatistipula has a round fruit, unusual in Tacsonia group species like banana passion flower and P. mixta, with their elongated tubes and brightly red to rose-colored petals.

Notable and sometimes economically significant pathogens of Passiflora are several sac fungi of the genus Septoria (including S. passiflorae), the undescribed proteobacterium called "Pseudomonas tomato" (pv. passiflorae), the Potyvirus passionfruit woodiness virus, and the Carlavirus Passiflora latent virus.

Uses

Ornamental

A number of species of Passiflora are cultivated outside their natural range for both their flowers and fruit. Hundreds of hybrids have been named; hybridizing is currently being done extensively for flowers, foliage and fruit. The following hybrids and cultivars have gained the Royal Horticultural Society's Award of Garden Merit:
'Amethyst'
P. × exoniensis (Exeter passion flower)
P. × violacea

During the Victorian era the flower (which in all but a few species lasts only one day) was very popular, and many hybrids were created using the winged-stem passion flower (P. alata), the blue passion flower (P. caerulea) and other tropical species.

Many cool-growing Passiflora from the Andes Mountains can be grown successfully for their beautiful flowers and fruit in cooler Mediterranean climates, such as the Monterey Bay and San Francisco in California and along the western coast of the U.S. into Canada. One blue passion flower or hybrid even grew to large size at Malmö Central Station in Sweden.

Passion flowers have been a subject of studies investigating extranuclear inheritance; paternal inheritance of chloroplast DNA has been documented in this genus. The plastome of the two-flowered passion flower (P. biflora) has been sequenced.

Fruit

A small pink fruit that wrinkles easily and a larger shiny yellow to orange fruit are traded under this name. The latter is usually considered just a variety of flavicarpa, but seems to be more distinct.
 Sweet granadilla (P. ligularis) is another widely grown species. In large parts of Africa and Australia it is the plant called "passionfruit": confusingly, in South African English the latter species is more often called granadilla (without an adjective). Its fruit is somewhat intermediate between the two sold as P. edulis.
 Maypop (P. incarnata), a common species in the southeastern US. This is a subtropical representative of this mostly tropical family. However, unlike the more tropical cousins, this particular species is hardy enough to withstand the cold down to  before its roots die (it is native as far north as Pennsylvania and has been cultivated as far north as Boston and Chicago.) The fruit is sweet, yellowish, and roughly the size of a chicken's egg; it enjoys some popularity as a native plant with edible fruit and few pests.
 Giant granadilla (giant tumbo or badea, P. quadrangularis), water lemon (P. laurifolia) and sweet calabash (P. maliformis) are Passiflora species locally famed for their fruit, but not widely known elsewhere .
 The blue passionflower (Passiflora caerulea) produces bright orange fruit with numerous seeds. While the fruit is edible, it is often described as being bland in comparison to other edible passionfruit, or with a flavour vaguely similar to blackberries.
 Wild maracuja are the fruit of P. foetida, which are popular in Southeast Asia.
 Banana passionfruits are the very elongated fruits of P. tripartita var. mollissima and P. tarminiana. These are locally eaten, but their invasive properties make them a poor choice to grow outside of their native range.

Ayahuasca analog
A native source of beta-Carbolines (e.g., passion flower in North America) is mixed with Desmanthus illinoensis (Illinois bundleflower) root bark to produce a hallucinogenic drink called prairiehuasca, which is an analog of the shamanic brew ayahuasca.

Traditional medicine and dietary supplement

P. incarnata (maypop) leaves and roots have a long history of use as a traditional medicine by Native Americans in North America and were adapted by European colonists. The fresh or dried leaves of maypop are used to make a tea that is used as a sedative. Passionflower as dried powder or an extract is used as a dietary supplement. There is insufficient clinical evidence for using passionflower to treat any medical condition.

Passionflower is classified as generally recognized as safe (GRAS) for use as a food ingredient in the United States.

Adverse effects
Passion flower is not recommended during pregnancy because it may induce contractions. Consuming passion flower products may cause drowsiness, nausea, dizziness, abnormal heart rhythms, asthma, or rhinitis.

Chemistry

Many species of Passiflora have been found to contain beta-carboline harmala alkaloids, some of which are MAO inhibitors. The flower and fruit have only traces of these chemicals, but the leaves and the roots often contain more. The most common of these alkaloids is harman, but harmaline, harmalol, harmine, and harmol are also present. The species known to bear such alkaloids include: P. actinia, P. alata (winged-stem passion flower), P. alba, P. bryonioides (cupped passion flower), P. caerulea (blue passion flower), P. capsularis, P. decaisneana, P. edulis (passion fruit), P. eichleriana, P. foetida (stinking passion flower), P. incarnata (maypop), P. quadrangularis (giant granadilla), P. suberosa, P. subpeltata and P. warmingii.

Other compounds found in passion flowers are coumarins (e.g. scopoletin and umbelliferone), maltol, phytosterols (e.g. lutenin) and cyanogenic glycosides (e.g. gynocardin) which render some species, i.e. P. adenopoda, somewhat poisonous. Many flavonoids and their glycosides have been found in Passiflora, including apigenin, benzoflavone, homoorientin, 7-isoorientin, isoshaftoside, isovitexin (or saponaretin), kaempferol, lucenin, luteolin, n-orientin, passiflorine (named after the genus), quercetin, rutin, saponarin, shaftoside, vicenin and vitexin. Maypop, blue passion flower (P. caerulea), and perhaps others contain the flavone chrysin. Also documented to occur at least in some Passiflora in quantity are the hydrocarbon nonacosane and the anthocyanidin pelargonidin-3-diglycoside.

The genus is rich in organic acids including formic, butyric, linoleic, linolenic, malic, myristic, oleic and palmitic acids as well as phenolic compounds, and the amino acid α-alanine. Esters like ethyl butyrate, ethyl caproate, n-hexyl butyrate and n-hexyl caproate give the fruits their flavor and appetizing smell. Sugars, contained mainly in the fruit, are most significantly d-fructose, d-glucose and raffinose. Among enzymes, Passiflora was found to be rich in catalase, pectin methylesterase and phenolase.

Etymology and names
The passion in passion flower refers to the passion of Jesus in Christian theology; the word passion comes from the Latin , meaning 'suffering'. In the 15th and 16th centuries, Spanish Christian missionaries adopted the unique physical structures of this plant, particularly the numbers of its various flower parts, as symbols of the last days of Jesus and especially his crucifixion:

 The pointed tips of the leaves were taken to represent the Holy Lance.
 The tendrils represent the whips used in the flagellation of Christ.
 The ten petals and sepals represent the ten faithful apostles (excluding St. Peter, who denied Jesus three times, and Judas Iscariot, who betrayed him).
 The flower's radial filaments, which can number more than a hundred and vary from flower to flower, represent the crown of thorns.
 The chalice-shaped ovary with its receptacle represents the Holy Grail.
 The three stigmas represent three nails and the five anthers below them five hammers or five wounds (four by the nails and one by the lance).
 The blue and white colors of many species' flowers represent Heaven and Purity.
 In addition, the flower is open for three days, symbolising the three years of Jesus' ministry.

The flower has been given names related to this symbolism throughout Europe since the 15th century.

Outside the Roman Catholic heartland, the regularly shaped flowers have reminded people of the face of a clock. In Hawaiian, they are called ;  is a string used for tying fabric together, such as a shoelace, and  means 'to spring forth leave'.

In India, blue passionflowers are called  in Karnataka and Maharashtra, while in Uttar Pradesh and generally north it is colloquially called  (referring to the five Pandavas in the Hindu epic, the ). The five anthers are interpreted as the five Pandavas, the divine Krishna is at the centre, and the radial filaments are opposing hundred. The colour blue is moreover associated with Krishna as the colour of his aura. 

This is one possible source of the name of the Tumbes region of Peru.

In Turkey, the shape of the flowers have reminded people of Rota Fortunae, thus it is called .

In South Africa the passionfruit is known as a granadilla.

Taxonomy

Passiflora is the most species rich genus of both the family Passifloraceae and the tribe Passifloreae. With over 550 species, an extensive hierarchy of infrageneric ranks is required to represent the relationships of the species. The infrageneric classification of Passiflora not only uses the widely used ranks of subgenus, section and series, but also the rank of supersection.

The New World species of Passiflora were first divided among 22 subgenera by Killip (1938) in the first monograph of the genus. More recent work has reduced these to 4, which are commonly accepted today (in order from most basally to most recently branching):
 Astrophea (Americas, ~60 species), trees and shrubs with simple, unlobed leaves
 Passiflora (Americas, ~250 species), woody vines with large flowers and elaborate corolla
 Deidamioides (Americas, 13 species), woody or herbaceous vines
 Decaloba (Americas, Asia and Australasia, ~230 species), herbaceous vines with palmately veined leaves

Some studies have shown that the segregate Old World genera Hollrungia and Tetrapathaea are nested within Passiflora, and form a fifth subgenus (Tetrapathaea). Other studies support the current four subgenus classification.

Relationships below the subgenus level are not known with certainty and are an active area of research. The Old World species form two clades – supersection Disemma (part of subgenus Decaloba) and subgenus Tetrapathaea. The former is composed of 21 species divided into sections Disemma (three Australian species), Holrungiella (one New Guinean species) and Octandranthus (seventeen south and east Asian species).

The remaining (New World) species of subgenus Decaloba are divided into seven supersections. Supersection Pterosperma includes four species from Central America and southern Mexico. Supersection Hahniopathanthus includes five species from Central America, Mexico and northernmost South America. Supersection Cicea includes nineteen species, with apetalous flowers. Supersection Bryonioides includes twenty-one species, with a distribution centered on Mexico. Supersection Auriculata includes eight species from South America, one of which is also found in Central America. Supersection Multiflora includes nineteen species. Supersection Decaloba includes 123 species.

See also
 List of culinary fruits

References

External links

 
 The Passiflora Society International
 Killip, The American Species of Passifloraceae, Fieldiana, Bot. 19 (1938)
 Passiflora online
 Passiflora edulis 
 Passiflora Picture Gallery
 Chilean Passiflora pictures
 A list of Heliconius Butterflies and the Passiflora species their larvae consume

 
Malpighiales genera
Butterfly food plants
Flora of Central America
Flora of South America
Garden plants of North America
Garden plants of Central America
Garden plants of South America
Medicinal plants
Edible fruits
Tropical fruit
Vines
Taxa named by Carl Linnaeus
Ayahuasca analogs